Michele Fabris (1644–8 July 1684) was a Baroque sculptor, born in Hungary, but mainly active in Venice and Padua. A series of busts at the Querini Stampalia Museum, previously attributed to Orazio Marinali, are now attributed to him. Due to his Hungarian origins, he is also referred to as l'Ongaro.

References

1627 births
1679 deaths
Hungarian artists
Italian sculptors
Italian male sculptors